Kevin Feterik (born September 14, 1977) is a former American and Canadian football quarterback. He played for the Calgary Stampeders of the Canadian Football League. He played college football at BYU. As a senior in college he was a finalist for the Davey O'Brien Award. A Roman Catholic, Feterik chose to attend the Church of Jesus Christ of Latter-day Saints-owned BYU due to its esteemed quarterback program. He had brief preseason stints in the XFL with the San Francisco Demons (he never played a regular season game due to a thumb injury) and the NFL with the Seattle Seahawks before landing with the Stampeders.

Feterik remains among the most controversial choices for a CFL starting quarterback in the 21st century. The team was owned at the time by Feterik's father Michael. Feterik served as backup to Marcus Crandell for his first two seasons before Crandell was injured and Michael Feterik insisted that his son get the starting position; coach Wally Buono resigned rather than acquiesce to the demand, and his successor Jim Barker insisted on a contract clause stating that if Kevin were to start, it would be only on his own merits. Feterik left the Stampeders after one season as starter and never played professional football again.

References

External links
BYU Cougars bio

1977 births
Living people
People from Westminster, California
Players of American football from California
Sportspeople from Orange County, California
American football quarterbacks
Canadian football quarterbacks
BYU Cougars football players
Calgary Stampeders players
American players of Canadian football
Brigham Young University alumni